Secondary Protocol is the first studio album by American rapper Wildchild. It was released on Stones Throw Records in 2003. The album's title meaning is about the artist wanting to show a more personal view, which is alternative to what he brings as a member of Lootpack.

Track listing

References

External links

2007 debut albums
Wildchild (rapper) albums
Stones Throw Records albums
Albums produced by Madlib
Albums produced by Oh No (musician)